Claire Tabouret (born 1981) is a French artist based in Los Angeles, California, United States. She works with figurative subject matter, using loose expressive brushstrokes in a broad palette, mimicking both artificial and natural hues.

Work
Tabouret's 'Makeup' (2015-ongoing) depicts young women and girls with their faces smeared with cosmetics. The smeared makeup references a child's first attempts at painting.

In 2017 Tabouret exhibited alongside Yoko Ono in the exhibit 'One Day I Broke a Mirror' at Villa De Medici. For the exhibit, she made paintings of groups of women, seated and looking forward, described as warriors, adventuresses, and conquerors.

Also in 2017, Tabouret painted the interior of a chapel on the estate of Pierre Yovanovitch, covering the interior walls of the chapel with a crowd of children in costumes.

For a two part exhibit in both Picasso's studio and Almine Rech Gallery, she painted a series using the subject matter of wrestlers and couples dancing, the struggle and harmony of the two subjects relating to her own feelings about the famous painter whose space she was responding to.

In 2021, Tabouret was included in the exhibition ‘Present Generations’ at the Columbus Museum of Art. The exhibition consisted of works to be donated to the museum in order to inaugurate the Columbus Museum of Art's Scantland Collection. Also in 2021, works by Tabouret were acquired by the Institute of Contemporary Art Miami and the Dallas Museum of Art. 

Tabouret's work was included in the 2022 exhibition Women Painting Women at the Modern Art Museum of Fort Worth.

Exhibitions 

 The Dance of Icarus, Yuz Museum, Shanghai, China 2017
 I am Crying because you are not crying, Château de Boisgeloup, Gisors, France, 2018
 La Ronde, Musée des Beaux-Arts de Rouen, Rouen, France, 2020
 Mirrors and Reflections, Jordan Schnitzer Museum of Art, Eugene, Oregon, 2020

References

External links 
 Official website
 Spotlight: Claire Tabouret, Siblings in ArtForum

1981 births
Living people
People from Pertuis
21st-century French women artists
French women painters
French expatriates in the United States
French women artists
French contemporary artists